The Mute of Portici is a 1922 German silent film directed by Arthur Günsburg. It is based on Daniel Auber's opera La muette de Portici.

Cast
In alphabetical order

See also
The Dumb Girl of Portici (1916)
The Mute of Portici (1952)

References

Bibliography

External links

1922 films
Films of the Weimar Republic
German silent feature films
Films set in the 1640s
Films set in Naples
Films based on operas
Films based on works by Eugène Scribe
German black-and-white films